Kingdom of Finland may refer to:

 Kingdom of Finland (1742)
 Kingdom of Finland (1918)

See also
 Finland (disambiguation)